MQU or mqu may refer to:

 MQU, the IATA code for Mariquita Airport, Colombia
 MQU, the Pinyin code for Minquan railway station, Shangqiu, Henan, China
 mqu, the ISO 639-3 code for Mandari dialect, South Sudan